The House at 5556 Flushing Road is a single-family home located in Flushing, Michigan. It was listed on the National Register of Historic Places in 1982.

The house was likely built some time between 1840 and 1860. It is a two-story Greek Revival structure with a rectangular floorplan. The facade is symmetrical, and five bays wide. The entrance is through a centrally placed door, flanked with paneled pilasters and topped with an entablature. The house is topped with a wide frieze and a cornice with returns.

References

		
National Register of Historic Places in Genesee County, Michigan
Greek Revival architecture in Michigan